This is a list of schools associated with United States overseas military operations in Europe and the Pacific, and in unincorporated U.S. territories.

Armed Forces Europe

Bahrain
 Bahrain School, Manama

Belgium
Brussels American School, Brussels
SHAPE Elementary School, Mons, Hainaut
SHAPE High School, Mons, Hainaut

Germany
Ansbach Elementary School, Ansbach, Bavaria
Ansbach Middle High School, Ansbach, Bavaria
Aukamm Elementary School, Wiesbaden, Hesse 
Bamberg Elementary School, Bamberg, Bavaria
Bamberg High School, Bamberg, Bavaria
Baumholder High School, Baumholder, Rhineland-Palatinate
Berlin American High School, Berlin
Bitburg Elementary School, Bitburg, Rhineland-Palatinate
Bitburg Middle School, Bitburg, Rhineland-Palatinate 
Bitburg High School, Bitburg, Rhineland-Palatinate
Böblingen Elementary School, Stuttgart, Baden-Württemberg
Bremen American High School, Bremen
Frankfurt American High School, Frankfurt, Hesse
Garmisch Elementary School, Garmisch-Partenkirchen, Bavaria
Grafenwöhr Elementary School, Grafenwöhr, Bavaria
Grafenwöhr Middle School, Grafenwöhr, Bavaria
Hainerberg Elementary School, Wiesbaden, Hesse
Heidelberg Middle School, Heidelberg, Baden-Württemberg
Heidelberg High School, Heidelberg, Baden-Württemberg
Hohenfels Elementary School, Hohenfels, Bavaria
Hohenfels High School, Hohenfels, Bavaria
Kaiserslautern Elementary School, Kaiserslautern, Rhineland-Palatinate
Kaiserslautern Middle School, Kaiserslautern, Rhineland-Palatinate
Kaiserslautern High School, Kaiserslautern, Rhineland-Palatinate
Landstuhl Elementary Middle School, Landstuhl, Rhineland-Palatinate
Mannheim Elementary School, Mannheim, Baden-Württemberg
Mannheim Middle School, Mannheim, Baden-Württemberg
Mannheim High School, Mannheim, Baden-Württemberg
Munich American High School, Munich, Bavaria
Nurnberg American High School, Furth, Bavaria
Patch Elementary School, Stuttgart, Baden-Württemberg
Patch High School, Stuttgart, Baden-Württemberg
Patrick Henry Elementary School, Heidelberg, Baden-Württemberg
Ramstein Elementary School, Ramstein Air Base, Rhineland-Palatinate
Ramstein Intermediate School, Ramstein Air Base, Rhineland-Palatinate
Ramstein Middle School, Ramstein Air Base, Rhineland-Palatinate
Ramstein High School, Ramstein Air Base, Rhineland-Palatinate
Robinson Barracks Middle School, Stuttgart, Baden-Württemberg
Smith Elementary School, Baumholder, Rhineland-Palatinate 
Stuttgart Elementary School Stuttgart Baden-Würtenburg
Stuttgart High School Stuttgart Baden-Würtemburg*
Vilseck Elementary School, Vilseck, Bavaria
Vilseck High School, Vilseck, Bavaria
Wiesbaden Middle School, Wiesbaden, Hesse
Wiesbaden High School, Wiesbaden, Hesse
Würzburg American High School, Würzburg, Bavaria

Italy
Aviano Elementary School, Aviano, Province of Pordenone
Aviano Middle School, Aviano, Province of Pordenone
Aviano High School, Aviano, Province of Pordenone
Livorno Elementary and Middle School, Livorno, Tuscany
Naples Elementary School, Gricignano di Aversa, Campania
Naples American High School, Gricignano di Aversa, Campania
Sigonella Elementary School, west of Catania, Province of Catania
Sigonella High School, west of Catania, Province of Catania
Vicenza Elementary School, Vicenza, Province of Vicenza
Vicenza American High School, Vicenza, Province of Vicenza

Netherlands
AFNORTH Elementary School, Brunssum
AFNORTH High School, Brunssum

Portugal
Lajes Elementary/High School, Lajes, Azores

Spain
David Glasgow Farragut Elementary School (formerly Rota Elementary School), Rota, Cádiz
David Glasgow Farragut High School (formerly Rota High School), Rota, Cádiz

Turkey
Ankara Elementary/High School (previously named George C. Marshall School), Ankara, Ankara Province
Incirlik Elementary/High School, İncirlik, Adana Province
Gazi Koleji

United Kingdom
Alconbury Elementary School, Huntingdon, Cambridgeshire 
Alconbury High School, Huntingdon, Cambridgeshire 
Croughton American School, Northamptonshire
Feltwell Elementary School, Feltwell, Norfolk
Lakenheath Elementary School, Lakenheath, Suffolk
Lakenheath Middle School, Feltwell, Norfolk
Lakenheath High School, Lakenheath, Suffolk
Liberty Intermediate School, Lakenheath, Suffolk
Menwith Hill Elementary & High School, Harrogate, England

Armed Forces Pacific

Guam
Guam High School, Asan
Andersen Elementary School, Yigo
Andersen Middle School, Yigo
Commander William C. McCool Elementary/Middle School, Naval Base Guam

Japan

Aomori Prefecture
Robert D. Edgren High School, Misawa Air Base, Misawa, Aomori
Sollars Elementary School, Misawa Air Base, Misawa, Aomori
Cummimngs Elementary School, Misawa Air Base, Misawa, Aomori

Kanagawa Prefecture
Zama American High School, Camp Zama, Zama, Kanagawa
Nile C. Kinnick High School, United States Fleet Activities Yokosuka, Yokosuka, Kanagawa
Sullivans Elementary School, United States Fleet Activities Yokosuka, Yokosuka, Kanagawa

Nagasaki Prefecture
Ernest J. King High School, United States Fleet Activities Sasebo, Sasebo, Nagasaki
Ernest J. King Middle School, United States Fleet Activities Sasebo, Sasebo, Nagasaki
John N. Darby Elementary School, United States Fleet Activities Sasebo, Sasebo, Nagasaki
Sasebo Elementary School, United States Fleet Activities Sasebo, Sasebo, Nagasaki

Okinawa Prefecture
Amelia Earhart Intermediate School, Kadena Air Base, Okinawa Island
Bob Hope Primary School, Kadena Air Base, Okinawa Island
Lester Middle School, Camp Lester, Okinawa Island
Kubasaki High School, Camp Foster, Okinawa Island
Kadena Elementary School, Kadena Air Base, Okinawa Island
Kadena High School, Kadena Air Base, Okinawa Island
Kadena Middle School, Kadena Air Base, Okinawa Island
Ryukyu Middle School, Kadena Air Base, Okinawa Island
Stearley Heights Elementary School, Kadena Air Base, Okinawa Island

Tokyo Prefecture
Joan K. Mendel Elementary School (formerly known as Yokota East Elementary School), Yokota Air Base, Fussa, Tokyo
Yokota High School, Yokota Air Base, Fussa, Tokyo
Yokota Middle School, Yokota Air Base, Fussa, Tokyo
Yokota West Elementary School, Yokota Air Base, Fussa, Tokyo

Yamaguchi Prefecture
Matthew C. Perry High School, Marine Corps Air Station Iwakuni, Iwakuni, Yamaguchi
Matthew C. Perry Elementary School, Marine Corps Air Station Iwakuni, Iwakuni, Yamaguchi
Iwakuni Elementary School, Marine Corps Air Station Iwakuni, Iwakuni, Yamaguchi
Iwakuni Middle School, Marine Corps Air Station Iwakuni, Iwakuni, Yamaguchi

South Korea
Osan American Elementary School, Songtan, Gyeonggi-do
Osan Middle School, Songtan, Gyeonggi-do
Osan American High School, Songtan, Gyeonggi-do
Seoul American Elementary School, Yongsan-gu, Seoul
Seoul American Middle School, Yongsan-gu, Seoul
Seoul American High School, Yongsan-gu, Seoul
Taegu American School, Daegu, Yeongnam
ICS International Christian School, Uijeongbu, Camp Red Cloud

American Samoa
Faga'itua High School, Faga'itua
Leone High School, Leone 
Manu'a High School, Ta'u
Nuuuli Technical High School, Nu'uuli
Samoana High School, Utulei
Tafuna High School, Tafuna
Kanana Fou High School, Tafuna
Marist/Fa'asao High School, Lepuapua
South Pacific Academy High School, Tafuna
Manumalo Baptist High School, Malaeimi
Pacific Horizons School, Tafuna

Cuba
W.T. Sampson Elementary School, Guantanamo Bay Naval Base, Cuba
W.T. Sampson High School, Guantanamo Bay Naval Base, Cuba

Guam

John F. Kennedy High School, Tamuning
St. John's School, Upper Tumon
Simon Sanchez High School, Yigo
Southern High School, Santa Rita
George Washington High School, Mangilao
 St. Paul Christian School, North Yigo

Northern Mariana Islands
Kagman High School, Saipan
Marianas High School, Saipan
Mt. Carmel School, Saipan
Rota High School, Rota
Saipan Southern High School, Saipan
Tinian Junior/Senior High School, Tinian
San Antonio Elementary School
Garapan Elementary School
Kagman Elementary/ Junior High School
Dan Dan Elementary School
William S. Reyes Elementary School
Gregory T. Camacho Elementary School
Hopwood Junior High School

U.S. Virgin Islands
Charlotte Amalie High School, Charlotte Amalie, St. Thomas
Ivanna Eudora Kean High School, St. Thomas
Antilles School, St. Thomas, USVI
All Saints Cathedral School, St. Thomas, USVI
Sts. Peter and Paul, St. Thomas, USVI
St. Croix Central High School, St. Croix
St. Croix Educational Complex High School, St. Croix
St. Croix Educational Complex Vocational, St. Croix
Addelita Cancryn Junior High, St. Thomas
John H. Woodson Junior High School, St. Croix
Elena L. Christian Junior High, St. Croix
Arthur Richards Junior High, Frederiksted, St. Croix
Manor School, St. Croix, USVI
St. Croix Country Day School

Puerto Rico
Antilles High School, Fort Buchanan, Puerto Rico
Antilles Middle School, Fort Buchanan, Puerto Rico
Antilles Intermediate School, Fort Buchanan, Puerto Rico 
Antilles Elementary School, Fort Buchanan, Puerto Rico 
Ramey School, Aguadilla, PR

See also
 Department of Defense Education Activity
 Department of Defense Dependents Schools

Notes and references 

Stuttgart High School is the new form of Patch Middle School
Stuttgart Elementary is the new form of Böblingen Elementary School

External links
List of schools associated with Armed Forces Europe 
List of schools associated with Armed Forces Pacific
List of schools in American Samoa
List of schools in Guam
List of schools in the Northern Mariana Islands
List of schools in the U.S. Virgin Islands
 Note: from SchoolTree.org for SY 03-04

Territories
Schools